Olya Kroytor, full name Olga Igorevna Kroytor (born 1986), is a Russian contemporary artist, based in Moscow. She works in the mediums of painting, collage, installation, sculpture, image manipulation and performance. She is particularly renowned for her performance pieces, receiving the Kandinsky Prize in 2015 in the category of 'Young artist: Project of the Year'.

Biography 
Born in 1986 in Moscow, she studied at Moscow State Pedagogical University in the Graphic Art Department (graduated in 2008) and the Institute of Contemporary Art (2009). Later she participated in Moscow Museum of Modern Art's programme «Free Workshops» (2007)

Olya Kroytor has shown her work in many different exhibitions, solo shows being «Unnecessary» (Komnata Gallery, Moscow, 2014),«Dissociative identity disorder» (Moscow Museum of Modern Art, Moscow, 2011), «Split personality» (Regina Gallery, Moscow, 2011), «Composition No1» (“Dvorets”, Saint Petersburg, 2010).

Her solo exhibition «Olya Kroytor. 8 Situations» inaugurated the opening of Artwin Gallery's space on Tverskoy Boulevard. Since then she has exhibited in Baku with «On The Other Side» (Kicik Qalart, 2015-2016) and in Moscow, «The Coordinates of Disappearance» (Artwin Gallery, Moscow, 2016). 

In 2016 she was the recipient of a fellowship from the Joseph Brodsky Memorial Fund.

References

Sources 
 MMOMA exhibition 
 «The Coordinates of Disappearance»

1986 births
Living people
Russian contemporary artists
Russian women painters
21st-century Russian women artists
Kandinsky Prize